Moriz Seeler (1 March 1896 – 1943?) was a German poet, writer, film producer, and man of the theatre.

Early life
Seeler was born in the small, provincial town of Greifenberg in Pomerania, Germany (now Gryfice in northwestern Poland), to a Jewish family.  He moved to Berlin at the age of 15. His first verses are said to have been published as early as 1917–1918; the first collection of poems, Dem Hirtenknaben, was issued in Berlin in 1919; another one, entitled Die Flut, saw the light of day in Vienna in 1937.

Biography
He is perhaps best known as the founding father of the Junge Bühne (‘Young Stage’), an avant‑garde matinee-theatre which came into being in Berlin in the spring of 1922.  In 1927 he co‑authored the libretto to Friedrich Hollaender’s cabaret Bei uns um die Gedächtniskirche rum.  In June 1929 he co‑founded (together with Robert Siodmak and Edgar G. Ulmer) Filmstudio 1929, a Berlin production house. In 1929–1930 he co‑produced, together with Heinrich Nebenzahl, the silent quasi-documentary film Menschen am Sonntag, directed by Robert Siodmak (1900–1973) and starring Brigitte Borchert and Erwin Splettstößer, which shows a candid picture of life in Weimar-era Germany that was soon to vanish for ever.

In 1998 a small book written about him by Günther Elbin, Am Sonntag in die Matinee, appeared in Germany.  Following this development, in November 2000, a memorial plaque was erected on the façade of the tenement at the Brandenburgische Straße 36 in what is now the Berlin borough of Charlottenburg-Wilmersdorf, identifying the house as the locale where Moriz Seeler lived from 1916 to the mid‑1920s: the inscription refers to him as a ‘Jewish poet’, not a German one.  In September 2002 a street, previously known as Franz‑Ehrlich-Straße, in another of the Berlin boroughs (that of Treptow-Köpenick), was renamed Moriz‑Seeler‑Straße in his honour.  The capital of Austria has had a street named Moritz‑Seeler‑Gasse (sic: not Moriz) since 1969.

His name is commonly spelt ‘Moritz Seeler’.

Disappearance
Having been imprisoned by the Nazis in November 1938, he is said to have been deported to Latvia, where he went missing in Riga, most likely having fallen victim to the Nazis in one of that city's three Jewish ghettos (according to another account, he was murdered at the Theresienstadt concentration camp in 1943and this account, less well-known and less generally accepted, may well be the accurate one).

See also
 Cinema of Germany
 Erich Heller (s.v. Life in letters)
 Marieluise Fleißer
 List of German language poets
 List of people who disappeared

Notes

1896 births
1940s missing person cases
German male poets
German-language poets
German theatre directors
German theatre managers and producers
Jewish poets
Year of death unknown
People from the Province of Pomerania
German people who died in the Theresienstadt Ghetto
People who died in the Riga Ghetto
20th-century German male writers
People from Gryfice